The Dougherty County Public Library is a public library system serving Dougherty County, Georgia. The Central Library is located in Albany, Georgia.

The library is a member of PINES, a program of the Georgia Public Library Service that covers 53 library systems in 143 counties of Georgia. Any resident in a PINES supported library system has access to the system's collection of 10.6 million books. The library is also serviced by GALILEO, a program of the University System of Georgia which stands for "GeorgiA LIbrary LEarning Online". This program offers residents in supported libraries access to over 100 databases indexing thousands of periodicals and scholarly journals. It also boasts over 10,000 journal titles in full text.

History
The first library in Albany, Georgia was a short lived subscription-based library which existed from 1879 until 1887 when the head librarian passed away. Numerous local book clubs attempted to create a new library, but no substantial associations were successful until 1900 when the Albany Library Association was formed. During the early years of the library books were collected from voluntary contributions. After some years the collection of 750 volumes was held in the east anteroom of the Chautauqua Auditorium on the second floor.

Albany Carnegie Library
As book donations continued to grow and space became scarce the city of Albany petitioned Andrew Carnegie for funds to construct a new public library for county use. On January 9, 1905 Carnegie granted $10,700 to be used to construct the building on the condition the town pay an annual maintenance fee of 10% of the donated price. Construction began that same year and finished in 1906, the building designed in Italian Renaissance style with two marble ionic columns in antis.

The library underwent an extensive rehabilitation in 1992, upgrading the building to accommodate for the Americans with Disabilities Act (ADA), installing HVAC throughout, and making minor repairs to the structure and landscaping. This same year the library was sold to be used as a gallery and museum as a new, larger branch was constructed one block over to house the growing collection of the county library system.

Branches
All library locations are within the Albany city limits.

Library systems in neighboring counties
Lee County Library to the north.
Worth County Library System to the east.
De Soto Trail Regional Library System to the south.
Kinchafoonee Regional Library System to the west.

References

External links
PINES Catalog

County library systems in Georgia (U.S. state)
Public libraries in Georgia (U.S. state)